Adel Adham (March 8, 1928 – February 1, 1996) was an Egyptian villain actor. He was known for his portrayal of evil and ambiguous characters.

Career
Adel Adham was born on March 8, 1928, in  Alexandria, Egypt, to an Egyptian father and Egyptian-Turkish mother.

His debut in cinema was the year 1945 in the film Laila, Daughter of the Poor (1945).

In his most recent film before his death, his character was told by another character that he will go to hell. Adham's character's response? "Well, if we go to heaven, we will not find anyone we know!"

Filmography 

Makansh alal bal (1950)
The Technical Director (1965)
Fares Bani Hemdan (1966)
El mughammerun el talata (1966)
El khaena (1966)
Come rubammo la bomba atomica (1967) - James Bomb
Nora (1967) - Fares
Akhtar Fagol fil Alam (1967) - Jean
Ayyam el-hob (1968) - Galal
Altin avcilari (1968)
Afrah (1968) - The Thief
Hiya wa l chayatin (1969)
El Achrar (1970)
The Lady of the Black Moons (1970) - Sami 
Adrift on the Nile (1971) - Ali
 The Killers (1971) – Aziz
Imtithal (1971)
The Visitor (1972)
Si può fare molto con sette donne (1972)
 The Guilty (1975)
Leqa ma al-madi (1975)
Hekmatak ya rab (1976) - Zaki Qodra
Ah ya liel ya zaman (1977) - Elias
Khateeat Malak (1979)
Piedone d'Egitto (1980) - Elver Zakar
Al shaytan yaez (1981)
Al-nasabin (1984)
El-forn (1984)
Safqa maa Emraa (1985) - Essam
El Sayed Eshta (1985) - Sayed Eshta
Ragol lehaza alzaman (1986)
Ragol lehaza alzaman (1986)
Enteqam, -al (1986)
Supermarket (1990) - Dr. Azmy
Sawwaq el hanem (1993) - Pasha

References

External links 
 

1928 births
1996 deaths
Egyptian male film actors
20th-century Egyptian male actors
Egyptian people of Turkish descent